Jassidophaga pilosa is a species of fly in the family Pipunculidae.

Distribution
Europe, North America.

References

Pipunculidae
Insects described in 1966
Diptera of Europe
Diptera of North America
Taxa named by Johan Wilhelm Zetterstedt